The 2018–19 Zenit Saint Petersburg season was the 94th season in the club's history and its 23rd consecutive season in the Russian Premier League. The club also participated in the Russian Cup and the UEFA Europa League. Zenit finished the season 1st, winning their 5th Russian Premier League title.

Season Events
Prior to the start of the season, 29 May 2018, Sergey Semak replaced Roberto Mancini as manager of Zenit.

Squad

Out on loan

Transfers

In

Out

Loans out

Released

Friendlies

Competitions

Russian Premier League

Results by round

Results

League table

Russian Cup

UEFA Europa League

Qualifying phase

Group stage

Knockout phase

Squad statistics

Appearances and goals

|-
|colspan="14"|Players away from the club on loan:

|-
|colspan="14"|Players who left Zenit during the season:

|}

Goal Scorers

Disciplinary record

References

FC Zenit Saint Petersburg seasons
Zenit Saint Petersburg
Zenit St.Petersburg
Russian football championship-winning seasons